Feuerschutzpolizei was a fire police unit in Nazi Germany and a branch of 
Nazi Germany's Ordnungspolizei, formed in 1938 when the German municipal professional fire brigades were transferred to the national police. The previously red fire vehicles, blue uniforms and fire service ranks were replaced by green fire vehicles, green uniforms and police ranks.

Organization

In 1941 there were Fire Protection Police units in 86 cities in Germany, in Ostmark (occupied Austria) and in General Government (occupied Poland). Outside these cities, the German fire services consisted of volunteer fire brigades, in cooperation with compulsory fire brigades (Pflichtfeuerwehr) and industrial fire brigades (Werkfeuerwehr). In spite of being a branch of the Ordnungspolizei, the Fire Protection Police was a municipal institution; respective cities having the budgetary responsibility for staff and equipment. Administratively and operationally the Fire Protection Police were, however, subordinated to the Ordnungspolizei.

Field Units
During the war, the Feuerschutzpolizei organized six motorized firefighting regiments. Their mission was to follow the German army's advance and have the main responsibility for the occupied territories fire protection and civil defense. Each regiment consisted of some 1000 firefighters.

In 1943 the regimental organization was abolished, the battalions becoming independent units. The fourth regiment was stood down, while nine battalions were formed from the rest. Each battalion consisted of about 400 fire fighters in three companies. A fourth company of non-citizens (Volksdeutsche, Ukrainians and Poles), were later added.
Feuerschutzpolizei-Regiment 1 Sachsen, 1939–1943 
Feuerschutzpolizei-Regiment 2 Hannover, 1941–1943
Feuerschutzpolizei-Regiment 3 Ostpreussen, 1941–1943
Feuerschutzpolizei-Regiment 4 Ukraine, 1941–1943
Feuerschutzpolizei-Regiment 5 Böhmen-Mähren, 1942–1943
Feuerschutzpolizei-Regiment 6 Niederlande, 1942–1943

Ranks

Notes

References

Citations

Bibliography

External links

 www.feuerloeschpolizei.de 
 Österreichischer Bundesfeuerwehrverband: Handbuch zur Feuerwehrgeschichte

Police units of Nazi Germany
Fire departments of Germany
1939 establishments in Germany
1945 disestablishments in Germany